Anthophrys is a genus of moths belonging to the subfamily Tortricinae of the family Tortricidae. The genus was erected by Alexey Diakonoff in 1960.

Species
Anthophrys spectabilis Diakonoff, 1960

See also
List of Tortricidae genera

References

 Brown, J. W. (2005). World Catalogue of Insects. 5 Tortricidae.
 Diakonoff (1960). Verhandelingen der Koninklijke Nederlandse Akademie van Wetenschappen. (2) 53 (2): 121.

External links
Tortricid.net

Archipini
Monotypic moth genera
Tortricidae genera
Taxa named by Alexey Diakonoff